The Sumatra is a breed of chicken native of the island of Sumatra in Indonesia. These chickens were originally imported from Sumatra in 1847 to the U.S. and Europe as fighting cocks for the purpose of entertainment, but today the breed is primarily kept for exhibition. 1883 is the year the
Sumatra was admitted to the American Standard of Perfection.

Characteristics 

Sumatras are primarily an ornamental breed kept for their attractive plumage. Most often they are a lustrous black with a green sheen throughout the body and tail. The breed comes in black, blue and white varieties, as well as the unstandardised splash - a natural result of breeding blue chickens. Cocks weigh , and hens about  Hens are poor layers with yearly totals of eggs amounting to about 100 white creamy eggs a year, and are exceptionally susceptible to broodiness. Both males and females have small to nonexistent wattles, and males often have multiple spurs on each leg. The Sumatra retains a strong flying ability, unlike most modern chicken breeds.

References 

Chicken breeds
Chicken breeds originating in Indonesia
Chicken breeds originating in Sumatra